The Georgetown Historic District is a national historic district located in Georgetown, Floyd County, Indiana. The district includes 163 contributing buildings, one contributing site, and three contributing structures in the central business district and surrounding residential sections of Georgetown. 

It developed between about 1835 and the 1950s, and includes notable examples of Greek Revival, Italianate, Classical Revival, Bungalow / American Craftsman, and Ranch style architecture. Notable buildings include the Georgetown Township Consolidated School (1925), Georgetown Firehouse (c. 1940), Wolfe Hotel (1835), Georgetown Bank (1909), First United Brethren Church (1843), Sherman Minton Birthplace (1858), and George R. Fox Saloon (c. 1910).

It was listed on the National Register of Historic Places in 2013.

References

Historic districts on the National Register of Historic Places in Indiana
Greek Revival architecture in Indiana
Italianate architecture in Indiana
Neoclassical architecture in Indiana
Historic districts in Floyd County, Indiana
National Register of Historic Places in Floyd County, Indiana